Now 05 is a compilation album released by EMI Music Australia and Warner Music Australia in 2004.

Track listing
Kelis – "Milkshake" (3:08)
Kylie Minogue – "Slow" (3:15)
Jamelia – "Superstar" (3:36)
Kevin Lyttle – "Turn Me On" (3:21)
Hilary Duff – "So Yesterday" (3:36)
Fabolous featuring Tamia – "Into You" (4:55)
Chingy featuring Ludacris and Snoop Dogg – "Holidae In" (4:33)
Atomic Kitten featuring Kool & the Gang – "Ladies Night" (3:07)
Boogie Pimps – "Somebody to Love" (Saltshaker Remix) (3:00)
J-Wess – "What Chu Want" (3:48)
Sean Paul – "Like Glue" (3:55)
Missy Elliott – "Pass That Dutch" (3:42)
Basement Jaxx featuring Lisa Kekaula – "Good Luck" (4:28)
Jet – "Are You Gonna Be My Girl" (3:37)
Jewel – "Stand" (3:13)
Michelle Branch – "Breathe" (3:34)
Robbie Williams – "Sexed Up" (4:23)
Matchbox Twenty – "Bright Lights"	(3:56)
Solitaire – "I Like Love (I Love Love)" (3:48)
Linus Loves featuring Sam Obernik – "Stand Back" (3:23)
Tom Novy featuring Lima – "Without Your Love" (3:43)

Charts

Certifications

External links 

 NOW 05 track listing

References 

2004 compilation albums
EMI Records compilation albums
Now That's What I Call Music! albums (Australian series)